An illegal immigrant in India is a foreigner who has entered India either without valid documents or who initially had a valid document, but has overstayed beyond the permitted time, as per the general provisions of the Citizenship Act as amended in 2003. Such persons are not eligible for citizenship by registration or naturalisation. They are also liable to be imprisoned for 2–8 years and fined.

An exception was made in 2015 for minority communities of Bangladesh,  Pakistan and Afghanistan who were compelled to seek shelter in India due to religious persecution or fear of religious persecution. They are not classified as illegal migrants and remain eligible for citizenship.

The Indian Census of 2001 gives information about migrants, but not exclusively illegal immigrants. As per the 2001 Census, Bangladeshis form the largest group of migrants in India, followed by Pakistanis.

Legal framework

Indian citizens and National Register of Citizens 
Indian nationality law is governed by the Citizenship Act, 1955 (Articles 5 to 11 (Part II) of the Constitution of India), which has been amended by the Citizenship (Amendment) Acts of 1986, 1992, 2003, 2005, 2015 and 2019.

The National Register of Citizens of India (NRC) is a register maintained by the Government of India containing names and certain relevant information for identification of Indian citizens of Assam state. The register was first prepared after the 1951 Census of India and since then, the exercise to update it for the first time commenced only recently due to an order of the Supreme Court of India in the year 2013.

The Government of India and various state governments are at varying stages of implementing the NRC at the national and state level.

Foreigners 
Persons in India without either a valid Indian citizenship or a visa are considered by the central  government as illegal and unlawful immigrants. Illegal immigrants are subject to The Foreigners Act, 1946 which defines a foreigner as a person who is not a citizen of India. According to Foreigners (Amendment) Order, 2015 persons belonging to minority communities in Bangladesh and Pakistan, namely, Hindus, Sikhs, Buddhists, Jains, Parsis and Christians who were compelled to seek shelter in India due to religious persecution or fear of religious persecution and entered into India on or before 31 December 2014 with or without valid documents including passport or other travel document are granted exemption from the application of provisions of the Foreigners Act, 1946.
Where the nationality of a person is not evident, the onus of proving whether a person is a foreigner or not shall lie upon such person. Furthermore, anyone who believes that a foreigner has entered India, or the owners and managers of the property where such a foreigner resides illegally in India must inform the nearest police station within 24 hours of their presence becoming known. The Foreigners Act empowers the Indian administration to detain a person until they are deported back to their country.

Illegal migrants 
Preventing the entry of illegal migrants into India is important as they impose pressure on citizens and pose a security threat, especially in sensitive areas such as Jammu and West Bengal. For example, the Indian security establishments said that "Some Rohingyas sympathizing with many militant group's ideologies may be active in Jammu, Delhi, Hyderabad, and Mewat and can be a potential threat to internal security."

According to Indian law, illegal immigrants are not refugees. Since India is not a signatory to the 1951 Refugee Convention, the United Nations principle of non-refoulement and impediment to expulsion does not apply in India. Illegal immigrants are denied impediment to expulsion if they do not fall within the host country's legal definition of a lawful refugee.

Illegal immigrants are people who migrate to a country in violation of the immigration laws of that country, or the continued residence of people without the legal right to live in that country. Illegal immigration tends to be financially upward, from poorer to richer countries.

In 2005, the Illegal Migrants (Determination by Tribunal) Act, 1983 was rejected by the Supreme Court of India which held that the act "has created the biggest hurdle and is the main impediment or barrier in the identification and deportation of illegal migrants." On 9 August 2012, during a Supreme Court hearing about a public interest litigation petition for deportation of illegal migrants, it was told that the policy of the government of India does not support any kind of illegal migration either into its territory or illegal immigration of its citizens and the government is committed to deporting illegal Bangladeshi migrants, but only lawfully.

Legal refugees 
The government of India has recognised immigrants from Tibet and Sri Lanka as refugees in the past, providing free education and some identification to the former.

The Citizenship Amendment Act 2019 amended the Citizenship Act, 1955 to allow migrants from minority communities like Hindu, Sikh, Buddhist, Jain, Christian, Parsi who fled religious persecution from Afghanistan, Bangladesh, and Pakistan to be eligible for Indian citizenship provided they came into the country on or before 31 December 2014, excluding people from the Muslim community (the majority community of those nations).

Demographics

Afghanistan immigrants 

By 2009, India had over 13,000 illegal immigrants from Afghanistan.
According to a report by the Afghan embassy in Delhi, refugees from Afghanistan, estimated at around 30,000 families, have, over the past two and a half decades, fled from their home towns due to large-scale conflicts, seeking safety in India's capital city. Many outsiders call Delhi home, but the Afghan people claim a special relationship with India and its capital, due to the ancient and modern history between both nations. There are nearly 11,000 Afghan refugees registered with the UNHCR in India, mainly living in Delhi and bordering areas. The refugees in Delhi face considerable hardships and difficulties.

Bangladeshi immigrants 

An estimation made in the year 2000 placed the total number of illegal Bangladeshi immigrants in India at 15 million, with around 300,000 entering every year. Some people say that for each illegal immigrant that is caught, four illegally enter the country. While many immigrants have settled in the border areas, some have moved on, even to faraway places such as Mumbai and Delhi. During the UPA government, Sriprakash Jaiswal, Union Minister of State for Home Affairs, made a statement in Parliament on 14 July 2004, saying that "12 million illegal Bangladeshi infiltrators were living in India", and West Bengal had the most with 5.7 million Bangladeshis. This led to protests from state government of Assam, ruled by Congress, and consequent retraction of this statement, saying that the numbers are unreliable. More recently, Kiren Rijiju, Minister of State for Home Affairs in the NDA government has put the figure at around 20 million. Critics point out that the Bengali politicians, particularly those from the ruling Trinamool Congress and the CPI (M), believe that a soft approach to the problem helps them to win Muslim votes.

According to the 2001 census, 3,084,826 people in India came from Bangladesh. No reliable numbers on illegal immigrants are currently available. Extrapolating the census data for the state of Assam alone gives a figure of 2 million. Figures as high as 20 million are also reported in the government and media. Samir Guha Roy of the Indian Statistical Institute called these estimates "motivated exaggerated". After examining the population growth and demographic statistics, Roy states that while a vast majority are illegal immigrants, significant amounts of internal migration is sometimes falsely thought to be immigrants. An analysis of the numbers by Roy revealed that on average around 91000 Bangladeshis illegally crossed over to India every year during the years 19811991.

The Bangladesh Liberation War and continued political and economic turmoil in Bangladesh in the following decades forced some Bangladeshis to seek refuge in India. During the war, at least 10 million Bangladeshis crossed into India illegally to seek refuge from widespread rape and genocide. Most of them migrated to the border states, particularly West Bengal and Assam. Due to persecution, illegal migrants have been defined in Assam Accord as those who infiltrated illegally after 24 December 1971.

Burmese immigrants 
There are an estimated 50,000100,000 Burmese Chin illegal immigrants are stated to be residing in India, mostly in the Indian state of Mizoram and a small number in Delhi.

Pakistani immigrants 
About 7,600 illegal immigrants from Pakistan resided in India in 2010. Many of the migrants are Hindus and Sikhs, who have overstayed, attempting to gain citizenship.

Rohingyas 

In recent years, Rohingya people have been increasingly seeking refuge in India, facing longstanding state-persecution in Myanmar.

According to the Union Government, there were 10565 Rohingya families in India as of 2015; Samaddar et al. extrapolated to arrive at a figure of over a million immigrants. In August 2017, the Bharatiya Janata Party led Union Government asked state governments to initiate the process of deportation for all illegal immigrants including Rohingyas. The government did not buckle despite criticism. This was challenged before the Supreme Court of India by three Rohingya refugees, wherein the Government of India submitted an affidavit claiming that there were over 40,000 "illegal [Rohingya] immigrants", mostly spread across Assam, West Bengal and Jammu and Kashmir and that they were a threat to the security of state.

In March 2021, several media reports claimed that about 150 Rohingya refugees from Jammu were held in detention centers. an interim application was filed seeking their release though the government denied any detainment. A bench of Sharad Bobde, A. S. Bopanna and V. Ramasubramanian passed an interim order in favor of the government; government-arguments about India being not bound to follow international conventions, she has not explicitly ratified and Art. 14 and Art. 21 not conferring any immunity to non-citizens from deportation (as mandated by procedure) were accepted.

Concerns over Bangladeshi illegal immigrants

Higher judiciary's concerns 
In 2005, a Supreme Court bench ruled Illegal Migrants (Determination by Tribunal) Act (IMDT) as unconstitutional while, with reference to the Sinha Report, maintained that the impact of the "aggression" represented by large-scale illegal migration from Bangladesh had made the life of the people of Assam and Tripura "wholly insecure and the panic generated thereby had created fear psychosis" in other north-eastern States. In August 2008, the Delhi High Court dismissed a petition by a Bangladeshi national against her deportation. The High Court ruled that the illegal Bangladeshi immigrants "pose a danger to India's internal security".

National security threats 

Apart from immigrants, a large number of smugglers regularly cross the porous border along West Bengal into India. They mainly engage in smuggling goods and livestock from India into Bangladesh to avoid a high tariff imposed on some Indian goods by Bangladesh government. Bangladeshi women and girls are also trafficked to India. The Centre for Women and Children Studies estimated in 1998 that 27,000 Bangladeshis have been forced into prostitution in India. According to the CEDAW report, 1% of all foreign prostitutes in India and 2.7% of prostitutes in Kolkata are from Bangladesh.

Rohingya adds economic pressure on Indian populace; due to their militant activities, they pose a security threat, especially in sensitive areas such as Jammu and West Bengal. Some Indian security establishments stated that "Some Rohingyas sympathizing with many militant group's ideologies may be active in Jammu, Delhi, Hyderabad, and Mewat and can be a potential threat to internal security."

State-specific concerns

Assam 

In Assam, the Assam Movement against illegal immigrants started as early as 1979 and ended in 1985, led by the All Assam Students Union. Over six years, 855 (later on 860 as submitted by AASU) people sacrificed their lives in the hope of an "Infiltration Free Assam". They demanded an end to the influx of immigrants and deportation of those who have already settled. It gradually took a violent turn and ethnic violence began between Assamese and Bengalis, mostly Muslims. It eventually led to the infamous Nellie massacre in 1983 due to a controversy over the 1983 election. In 1985, the Indian Government signed the Assam Accord with the leaders of the protest to stop the issue. As per the accord, India began building a fence along the Assam-Bangladesh border which is now almost complete. However, Assam also has a large number of legal Indian Muslims. It is difficult to distinguish between illegal Bangladeshis and local Bengali speakers. In some cases, genuine Indian citizens have been discriminated against. Allegations exist that nationalist parties such as the Bharatiya Janata Party as well as the Indian National Congress have discriminated against Bengali-speaking Muslims. On the other hand, reports of Bangladeshis being able to secure Indian ration and voter identity cards have come out.

After the 1991 census, the changing demographic patterns in border districts became more visible. It created anxiety and tension in India throughout the nineties. Both conservatives, as well as moderates, expressed concern on this issue. The first BJP government came into power in 1998 and subsequently ordered the construction of the Indo-Bangladesh barrier to stop migrants and illegal trade along the border. It was planned to enhance the already existing barrier in Assam and to encircle West Bengal, Tripura and Mizoram as well.

Delhi 
There is an organised influx of nearly 40,000 illegal Bangladeshi and Rohingya Muslim immigrants in Delhi who have been said to pose a national security risk and threaten the national integration. A lawyer named Ashwini Upadhyay filed a Public Interest Litigation (PIL) in the "Supreme Court of India" (SC) to identify and deport these. In a response to this PIL, Delhi Police told the SC in July 2019 that nearly 500 illegal Bangladeshi immigrants had been deported in the preceding 28 months.

Haryana 

In September 2019, the Chief Minister of Haryana, Manohar Lal Khattar announced the implementation of NRC for Haryana by setting up a legal framework under the former judge of the Punjab and Haryana High Court, Justice HS Bhalla for updating NRC which will help in "weeding out" these illegal immigrants.

Jammu and Kashmir 
There are Rohingya illegal immigrants in Jammu, which has created a dissatisfaction among the general public that Rohingya Muslim settlements in Jammu will change the demographics of the Hindu majority and may lead to violence in the future by giving reference to the exodus of Kashmiri Hindus by Kashmiri Muslims earlier. The presence of Rohingya Muslims in Jammu is thus considered as a sensitive issue for Indian security.

Kerala 
Although Kerala is at a large distance from Bangladesh (~2500 km), Bangladeshi illegal migrants have been moving to Kerala owing to the high wages for unskilled and semi-skilled labourers. Following the Kerala Police unearthing, the international footprint of this operation, both the Intelligence Bureau and National Investigation Agency (NIA) have started probing. Some illegal migrants are fully equipped with all valid Indian documents by the time they reach their destinations. The Kerala police are reportedly finding it difficult to check the influx of these Bangladeshi migrants. Kerala State Intelligence officials said they found that a large section of Migrant labourers in Kerala claiming to be from West Bengal or even Assam were actually from Bangladesh. Anti-national activities have been reported; the latest in which in August 2016, a native of West Bengal was arrested for insulting the national flag and he was later found to be an illegal immigrant from Bangladesh. There is said to be a major racket at the borders of West Bengal and Assam with Bangladesh which provides illegal migrants with identity cards.

Mizoram 
Bangladeshi Buddhist Chakma immigrants from Bangladesh have settled in the southern part of Mizoram because they were displaced by the construction of the Kaptai Dam on the Karnaphuli River in 1962, the dam flooded 655 square kilometres and displaced over 100,000 people, most of them were Chakma people. As there was no rehabilitation and compensation, they fled from Bangladesh to India. The Chakma people also resisted inclusion into Bangladesh during the Bangladeshi Independence in 1971 through armed struggle led by Shanti Bahini because they were ethnically, culturally and religiously distinct, this violent confrontation between Shanti Bahini and Bangladeshi Army led to Chakma fleeing Bangladesh for India.

Tripura 
Tripura demographics have been altered due to the influx of illegal Bangladeshi refugees and immigrants alike. The politics and socio-economic conditions have been greatly affected by it. The influx started from the 70s after the Liberation of Bangladesh 1971. The proportion of the local Tripuri population was reduced from 59.1% in 1951 to 31.1% in 2011. All major political parties in Tripura favour the replication of National Register of Citizens of India (NRC) in their state too, although with some riders.

Uttar Pradesh 
In October 2019, UP's Director general of police who cited "very important" concerns for the state's internal security, instructed all district police chiefs, IG, DIG range and ADG zone to commence a statewide campaign to start Identifying illegal Bangladeshi and foreigners. UP DGP Headquarters has prepared for an NRC for UP requires identification of new settlements around the railway stations, bus stands, roadsides and slum clusters where Bangladeshi and other foreign nationals could be illegally residing. They will be fingerprinted, and their identity verification will be video recorded, and suspicious people will be verified in a time-bound manner. Police will also track down government employees and touts who prepared fake documents for these illegal migrants.

Illegal Bangladeshi and Rohingyas are found in several cities of Uttar Pradesh (UP) by changing their identity and name, making it difficult to get an idea of their background. A large number of illegal Bangladeshis resided under a fake identity in ashrams and rented houses in Mathura, Vrindavan, Govardhan and other places for several years without a passport or other valid documents. They illegally crossed the border into India, acquire the fake identity, open bank accounts and used to send money from relatives back in their country. In October 2019, cops held 150 illegal Bangladeshi intruders who admitted to having come from Bangladesh by the river. All of them had acquired an Aadhar card, bank passbook, ration card and voter ID cards from India. They pose significant security and terrorism, law and order risk, due to religious activities in the Mathura area. They prefer Mathura as it is easier to hide among the transient pilgrims, and also because Mathura is on the border of Delhi, Haryana and Rajasthan where they can easily escape.

West Bengal 
The other Indian state affected by this problem, West Bengal, remained mostly calm during this period. However Indian newspapers reported that "the state government has reported that illegal Bangladeshi migrants have trickled into parts of rural Bengal, including Nandigram, over the years, and settled down as sharecroppers with the help of local Left leaders. Though a majority of these immigrants became tillers, they lacked documents to prove the ownership of land.

The Government of Bangladesh has denied India's claims on illegal immigration.

After the 2001 census, the anxiety somewhat reduced when the growth rates were found to have returned to near-normal levels, particularly in West Bengal, thus negating the fear that there was an unabated influx of migrants, although some concern remains.

The proportion of Muslims in West Bengal has grown from 19.85% in 1951 to 27.01% in 2011. That, of course, does not have any reflection on immigration, it is generally attributed to a higher growth rate amongst the Muslims. However, when one has a closer look at the CD Blocks along the India-Bangladesh border questions come up. The exceedingly high decadal population growth rate in certain CD Blocks, such as in  Basirhat subdivision in North 24 Parganas district and CD Blocks along with the riverine international border in Murshidabad district does raise concerns.
 
The decadal growth rate of the population for West Bengal in 200111 was 13.93%. The decadal growth of population in Basirhat I CD Block in 20012011 was 16.16%. The decadal growth of population in Basirhat I CD Block in 19912001 was 20.94%. The decadal growth of population in Hasnabad CD Block in 20012011 was 14.50%. The decadal growth of the population in Hasnabad CD Block in 19912001 was 17.47%. The decadal growth rate of population in neighbouring Satkhira District in Bangladesh was 6.50%  for the decade 20012011, down from 16.75% in the decade 19912001 and 17.90% in the decade 19811991.

The decadal growth rates, for the decade 20012011, were still higher in the border areas of Murshidabad district. In Raghunathganj II CD Block it was 37.82%, the highest amongst all the CD Blocks in the Murshidabad district, 34.09% in Samserganj CD Block, 30.82 in Suti II CD Block, 29.02% in Suti I CD Block, 23.62% in Lalgola CD Block, 22.24% In Bhagawangola II CD Block and 21.65% in Bhagawangola I CD Block. The decadal growth rate of population in  Chapai Nawabganj District was 15.59% for the decade 20012011, down from 21.67% in the decade 19912001. The decadal growth rate of the population in the Rajshahi District was 13.48% for the decade 20012011, down from 21.19% in the decade 19912001. Both districts are across the Ganges, in Bangladesh.

In both, the above cases the comparisons are between Bengali-speaking Muslim-majority areas, and hence the argument of higher growth rate amongst Muslims does not hold good. There are also other similar examples.

Notes

References

External links

Bangladeshis in Assam flee anti-migrant drive, International Herald Tribune, 20 May 2005.
Bangladesh, Factbook on Global Sexual Exploitation, Coalition Against Trafficking in Women
Immigration Services

 
Immigration
Foreign relations of India
History of the Republic of India
Internal security issues of India
National security of India
Social issues in India